"Workaholic" is a song recorded by Belgian/Dutch Eurodance band 2 Unlimited, released in April 1992 as the third single from their debut album, Get Ready!. The album version was an instrumental track but the released version featured a chorus from Anita Doth and, outside the UK, verses from Ray Slijngaard. The single scored chart success in many countries, with its highest peaks coming in Finland, the Republic of Ireland, the UK and Zimbabwe, where it hit number-one in August 1992.

Content
The opening segment of the song features bells ringing in descending followed by ascending order (replicating the Westminster chime effect). It is the same segment that is played at Yankee Stadium in New York City whenever baseball's New York Yankees score a run and at multiple NHL arenas, such as the Staples Center's Los Angeles Kings, when a penalty is called against the visiting team. It is also used when the Los Angeles Lakers score a 3 Point Basket.

Controversially, on the album version of the song, there was a quote: "Who the fuck are you?" at the beginning of the track. However, in the radio edit and the music video, the entire quote is omitted. A version also included in the album, labelled as an "instrumental" version (although it is not such, it retains all of Ray and Anita's vocals) removes the quote and surrounding lines, moving the first "The workaholic" to before the bell intro.

The opening phrase in the song, "Ok, let's go to work" comes from the 1987 film Wall Street.

Critical reception
Bevan Hannah from The Canberra Times described the song as a "faster version" of "Get Ready for This". Andy Kastanas from The Charlotte Observer wrote, "These guys make a strong showing, following up their No. 1 single "Twilight Zone" with another monstrous rave song." Irish newspaper Evening Herald commented, "Expect 2 Unlimited's next single Workaholic, to be massive". James Hamilton from Music Weeks RM Dance Update called it a "galloping commercial raver", like "an updated Boney M for the Nineties". Johnny Dee from Smash Hits rated the track four out of five, stating that it is a "zippy, loopy, stormtrooper overdrive that is guaranteed to cause twisted ankles and sislocated shoulders should you decide on a spot of aerobicising during its lightning fast four minutes."

Chart performance
"Workaholic" was successful on the charts on several continents. In Europe, it reached its highest peaks in Finland and the Republic of Ireland as number two. In the UK, it peaked at number four in its third week at the UK Singles Chart, on May 10, 1992. Additionally, it was a Top 10 hit also in Belgium, the Netherlands, Norway and Spain, while reaching the Top 30 in Sweden and the Top 40 in Switzerland. On the Eurochart Hot 100, "Workaholic" reached number 14, and on MTV's European Top 20, it peaked at number 11. Outside Europe, it was a number-one hit in Zimbabwe in August 1992, and peaked at number six on the RPM dance chart in Canada and number 26 on the Billboard Hot Dance Club Play in the US. In Australia, the single reached number 35.

Music video
A music video was produced to promote the single, directed by British director David Betteridge. He had previously directed the videos for "Get Ready for This" and "Twilight Zone". "Workaholic" was later published on 2 Unlimited's official YouTube channel in January 2014. The video has amassed more than 252,000 views as of September 2021.

Track listings

 7" single "Workaholic" (Vocal Edit) — 3:34
 "Workaholic" (Instrumental Edit) — 3:34

 12" maxi "Workaholic" (Extended Mix)
 "Workaholic" (Rio & Le Jean Mix)
 "Get Ready for This" (Rio & Le Jean '92 Remix)

 CD single, Germany "Workaholic" (7" Vocal Edit) — 3:34
 "Workaholic" (Extended Mix) — 5:51
 "Workaholic" (Rio & Le Jean Remix) — 5:07
 "Workaholic" (Hardcore Remix) — 4:15

 CD single, Netherlands "Workaholic" (Extended Mix) — 5:51
 "Workaholic" (Rio & Le Jean Remix) — 5:07
 "Workaholic" (Hardcore Remix) — 4:15
 "Workaholic" (Vocal Edit) — 3:34
 "Get Ready for This" (Rio & Le Jean Remix '92) — 4:11

 CD single, UK "Workaholic" (7" Mix) — 3:07
 "Workaholic" (Extended Mix) — 5:22
 "Get Ready for This" (Rio & Le Jean Remix '92) — 4:10

 CD maxi, Benelux'
 "Workaholic" (Extended Mix) — 5:51
 "Workaholic" (Rio & Le Jean Remix) — 5:07
 "Workaholic" (Hardcore Remix) — 4:15
 "Workaholic" (Vocal Edit) — 3:34
 "Get Ready For This" (Rio & Le Jean Remix '92) — 4:11

Charts

Weekly charts

Year-end charts

References

1992 singles
2 Unlimited songs
1991 songs
Songs written by Ray Slijngaard
Songs written by Phil Wilde
Byte Records singles
ZYX Music singles
Songs written by Jean-Paul De Coster
Music videos directed by David Betteridge
Number-one singles in Zimbabwe